Astro Bella was a South American television channel by the Malaysian satellite provider Astro on channel 133. When it began broadcasting on 5 March 2012, the channel broadcast telenovelas, the first channel of its kind in Malaysia. The channel was broadcast on the channel number previously used B4U, a Bollywood movie channel. (Astro channel 133 was previously used by B4U, which ceased broadcasting on 5 March 2012). The channel was included in the network's Mustika package. The channel contain telenovelas from the Philippines, Mexico, Thailand, Vietnam, Latin America, Brazil, Portugal, Greece, Poland, Spain, Arabia and Italy. While most telenovelas were broadcast in their original audio with Bahasa Malaysia subtitles, some of them were broadcast with dubbing in the native language.

Selected telenovelas were broadcast in HD on Astro Mustika HD. Similarly, several locally produced dramas aired on Astro Mustika HD are also available on Astro Bella.

Their programs expanded during September–October 2015 to include lifestyle programs, such as travel and cooking, in addition to telenovelas.

See also 
 List of programmes broadcast by Astro Bella

References
Astro Bella TV Guide

Astro Malaysia Holdings television channels
Filipino-language television stations
Spanish-language television stations
Television channels and stations established in 2012